Richard McBride is an American visual effects supervisor. He worked on various feature films, including Gravity (2013) and The Revenant (2015).

In 2016, Richard McBride was nominated at the 88th Academy Awards for his work on the film The Revenant in the category for Best Visual Effects. His nomination was shared with Cameron Waldbauer, Matt Shumway and Jason Smith.

Filmography
 2013: Gravity
 2015: The Revenant
 2018: A Wrinkle in Time

References

External links

Living people
Special effects people
Year of birth missing (living people)
Place of birth missing (living people)
Annie Award winners